The 2011–12 season was Montrose’s sixth consecutive season in the Scottish Third Division, having been relegated from the Scottish Second Division at the end of the 1995–96 season. Montrose also competed in the Challenge Cup, League Cup and the Scottish Cup.

Summary
Montrose finished eighth in the Third Division. They reached the first round of the Challenge Cup, the first round of the League Cup and the third round of the Scottish Cup.

Results & fixtures

Third Division

Challenge Cup

Scottish League Cup

Scottish Cup

Player statistics

Squad 
Last updated 5 May 2012 

 

 

|}

Disciplinary record

Includes all competitive matches.

Last updated 5 May 2012

Awards

Last updated 28 September 2012

League table

Transfers

Players in

Players out

References

Montrose F.C. seasons
Montrose